Airship Syndicate Entertainment, Inc.  is an American video game development company based in Austin, Texas. Founded by several ex-Vigil Games staff including Joe Madureira and Ryan Stefanelli, in 2014, Airship Syndicate is most known for developing Battle Chasers: Nightwar (2017), Darksiders Genesis (2019) and Ruined King: A League of Legends Story (2021).

History

Vigil Games, the creator of the Darksiders series, was shut down after publisher THQ declared Chapter 11 bankruptcy. The co-founders of Vigil Games, Joe Madureira returned to work for Marvel Comics, while Ryan Stefanelli joined Crytek USA and worked on Hunt: Horrors of the Gilded Age. After Hunts development was rebooted by Crytek and Madureira finished his work on the comics, the two, alongside ex-Vigil Games animator Steve Madureira, decided to start an independent studio with a small team, as they felt that Vigil grew to become too big. When they were choosing the studio's name, they initially considered using the name "Chaotic Evil", but they dropped the name after realizing that it was once used by a porn site. According to Madureira, they ultimately decided to use the title "Airship Syndicate" instead, since the title reflected a "vibe of exploration and otherworldly technologies".

After the company's establishment, it quickly began developing a dungeon crawling game, which was described by the team as a "love letter" to JRPG. Initially set to be a new intellectual property (IP), the game was later set in the Battle Chasers universe, which was created by Madureira. Madureira had reservations since he considered Battle Chasers to be an old comic book series and he was unsure if "fans would care". Nonetheless, when Battle Chasers: Nightwar launched on Kickstarter, it earned more than $850,000, surpassing its initial goal of $500,000. The team expanded since the scope of the project increased significantly during the course of development. The game was released in October 2017 by THQ Nordic and it was both a critical and commercial success.

After the successful release of Battle Chasers: Nightwar, the studio began pitching to THQ Nordic, the owner of the Darksiders IP, about a new installment in the series. Gunfire Games was working on Darksiders III, but due to Airship Syndicate's small size, it wanted to create a game with a smaller scope. The new installment, titled Darksiders Genesis, is played from an isometric perspective, unlike other games in the series. It has a two-year development cycle. The game was released to generally positive reviews in December 2019.

At The Game Awards 2019, the studio announced Ruined King: A League of Legends Story, a single-player turn-based role-playing game set in the League of Legends universe. Riot Forge published the game. The game was released on November 16, 2021 to generally favorable reviews from critics with an average Metacritic score of 84/100 based on 10 critic reviews. Airship Syndicate also confirmed that a next-generation console version for PlayStation 5 and Xbox Series X/S will be available as a free upgrade at a later date.

During TennoCon 2022, AirShip Syndicate announced that they are collaborating with Digital Extremes for the development of a massively multiplayer online game. The game, Wayfinder, was announced during The Game Awards 2022.

Games

References

External links
 

Companies based in Austin, Texas
Video game development companies
Video game companies based in Texas
American companies established in 2014
Video game companies established in 2014
2014 establishments in Texas
Privately held companies based in Texas
Indie video game developers